The Blu-ray Disc Association (BDA) is the industry consortium that develops and licenses Blu-ray Disc technology and is responsible for establishing format standards and promoting business opportunities for Blu-ray Disc. The BDA is divided into three levels of membership: the board of directors, contributors, and general members.

The "Blu-ray Disc founder group" was started on 20 May 2002 by nine electronic companies: Panasonic, Pioneer, Philips, Thomson, LG Electronics, Hitachi, Sharp, Samsung Electronics and Sony.
In order to enable more companies to participate, it announced in May 2004 that it would form the Blu-ray Disc Association, which was inaugurated on 4 October 2004.

Members

Board
The board members as of November 2016 are:

 Sony
 Xperi
 DTS
 Hitachi-LG Data Storage
 Intel Corporation
 Koninklijke Philips
 LG Electronics
 Lionsgate
 Mitsubishi Electric
 Oracle Corporation
 Panasonic
 Pioneer Corporation
 Samsung Electronics
 Sharp Corporation
 Dolby Laboratories
 Vantiva
 Toshiba
 Universal Studios
 Walt Disney Company
 Warner Brothers

Contributors
The contributors as of December 2017 are:
 BluFocus Inc.
 CESI Technology Co. Ltd.
 China Hualu group Co., Ltd.
 Corel Corporation
 CyberLink
 Deluxe Digital Studios, Inc.
 Fraunhofer IIS
 Irdeto USA, Inc
 JVC KENWOOD Corporation
 Memory-Tech Holdings Inc
 Scenarist Inc
 Testronic Laboratories, Inc.
 sMedio, Inc.
 Funai Electric Co., Ltd.
 Lionsgate Entertainment
 Lite-On IT Corporation
 MediaTek Inc
 Nvidia Corporation
 Ritek

Timeline of major changes to membership
 On 3 October 2004 20th Century Fox announced that it was joining the BDA, and on 29 July 2005 the studio officially announced its support for Blu-ray Disc.
 On 10 March 2005 Apple Computer announced its support for Blu-ray Disc and joined the BDA.
 On 31 August 2006 Sun Microsystems joined the BDA.
 On 30 August 2007, during the IFA Consumer Electronics Fair 2007, Acer and China Hualu joined BDA, and a few days later Acer also announced that they joined HD DVD North American Promotion Group.

Timeline of major events and announcements involving members
 On 30 June 2004 Panasonic, a founder member of the Blu-ray Disc Association, became the second manufacturer after Sony to launch a Blu-ray Disc consumer product into the Japanese market. The DMR-E700BD recorder supported writing to existing DVD formats, and became the first unit to read and write to dual-layer Blu-ray Discs with a maximum capacity of 50 gigabytes. The launch price of the recorder was US$2780.
 On 8 December 2004 The Walt Disney Company (and its home video division, Buena Vista Home Entertainment) announced its exclusive support for Blu-ray Disc.
 On 7 January 2005 Vivendi Games and Electronic Arts announced their support for the Blu-ray Disc format.
 On 28 July 2005 Verbatim Corporation, part of Mitsubishi Chemical Media, announced its support for Blu-ray Disc and HD DVD storage format development.
 On 17 August 2005 Lions Gate Home Entertainment announced it would release its content using the Blu-ray Disc format.
 On 7 September 2005 Samsung confirmed their next generation of optical drives will support Blu-ray Disc and HD DVD discs.
 On 2 October 2005 Both Paramount and The Weinstein Company announced they would endorse Blu-ray Disc, while still supplying content on the rival HD DVD — in order to give consumers a choice.
 On 20 October 2005 Warner Bros. announced they would release titles on the Blu-ray Disc format, in addition to HD DVD Video.
 On 1 November 2005 20th Century Fox announced it would release its content using the Blu-ray Disc format.
 On 9 November 2005 Metro-Goldwyn-Mayer announced it would support Blu-ray Disc, and plans to have titles available when Blu-ray Disc is launched.
 On 19 November 2005, Sony Pictures Home Entertainment announced that they finished editing the first Blu-ray Disc, a full-length movie, Charlie's Angels: Full Throttle. The disc uses MPEG-2 compression at a resolution of 1920×1080 (it was not announced whether it will be 1080p or 1080i) and claims to use a menu interface that would succeed current DVD-Video interfaces.
 On 4 January 2006, at the Consumer Electronics Show Samsung and Philips announced their first Blu-ray Disc players for the U.S. market. Samsung announced the BD-P1000, retailing for US$1000 and sporting HDMI output with backward support for DVD formats (DVD-RAM, DVD-RW, DVD-R, DVD+RW, and DVD+R), while Philips announced the BDP-9000. Philips also announced their all-in-one PC TripleWriter Blu-ray Disc drive and range of Blu-ray Disc media would arrive in 2nd quarter of 2006.
 On 7 March 2006 Sony announced it would be shipping rewritable single-layer 25 GB 2x speed Blu-ray Discs to Europe, with dual-layer discs arriving later in the year.
 On 16 March 2006 Sony announced a Blu-ray Disc player, the first VAIO desktop PC with a Blu-ray Disc recorder, and a Blu-ray Disc internal PC drive would be released in the summer of 2006. The VAIO PC would be shipped with a free 25 GB Blank BD-RE (rewritable) Blu-ray Disc worth $25 USD.
 On 10 April 2006 TDK announced in a press release that it began shipping 25 GB BD-R and BD-RE media (at prices of $19.99 USD and US$24.99 respectively). TDK also announced that it would be releasing 50 GB BD-R and BD-RE media later this year (at prices of US$47.99 and $59.99 respectively).
 On 16 May 2006 Sony announced its first VAIO notebook computer that will include a built-in Blu-ray Disc recorder with a 17" WUXGA display capable of displaying 1080p (at a price of US$3499.99). The VAIO shipped in June including software to play Blu-ray Disc movies and an HDMI-A input for other HD devices, and that the PlayStation 3 home video game console would be using the Blu-Ray Disc format. The console's predecessor, PlayStation 2, uses DVDs for video game software.
 On 17 May 2006 Pioneer shipped BDR-101A, a PC-based Blu-ray Disc recorder drive.
 On 15 June 2006, Samsung announced the industry's first BD-P1000 player had begun shipping to U.S. retail stores for availability on June 25, 2006.
 On 18 July 2006 Verbatim Corporation announced that it was shipping its ScratchGuard coated BD-R and BD-RE Blu-ray Disc recordable and rewritable discs to stores in Europe, with discs priced between £20 and £24 (GBP).
 On 16 August 2006 Sony announced shipment of 50 GB dual-layer Blu-ray Disc recordable discs with a suggested retail price of $48.
 On 4 January 2008, Warner Bros. announces that it would abandon HD-DVD support by the end of May.
 On 5 January 2008, New Line Cinema announced it would be following Warner's lead, backing Blu-ray exclusively.
 On 11 February 2008, Netflix announced to phase out HD DVDs and begin to carry only Blu-ray Discs.
 On 19 February 2008, Universal Studios announced it would be releasing movies on Blu-ray Disc format making it the last Hollywood major motion picture studio to release titles on the Blu-ray Disc format.
 On 20 February 2008, The Weinstein Company announced it would be releasing movies on Blu-ray Disc format.
 On 21 February 2008, Paramount Pictures announced it would be releasing movies on Blu-ray Disc format.
 On 21 February 2008, DreamWorks SKG announced it would be following Paramount and Amblin's lead, it would abandon HD-DVD support by the end of March.
 On 15 August 2008, Microsoft added Blu-ray native support to their operating systems Windows XP, Windows Vista, Windows Server 2003 and Windows Server 2008.
 On 21 May 2013, Microsoft announced that the Xbox One home video game console would be using the Blu-ray Disc format. The console's predecessor, Xbox 360, uses DVDs for video game software and supports an optional external HD DVD drive for films (which has been discontinued in February 2008)

References

External links
 Blu-ray Disc Association

Blu-ray Disc
High-definition television
Organizations established in 2004
Technology consortia